is a Japanese mobile game. It was adapted into an anime television series in 2011.

References

External links
 Official website 
 

2011 Japanese television series debuts